Oliver Edward Brymer Whyte (born 20 January 2000) is a New Zealand footballer who plays as a midfielder for Finnish club Haka.

Career

In 2018, Whyte joined the youth academy of Portuguese side Rio Ave from the Wellington Phoenix academy. In 2019, he was freely transferred to Team Wellington in New Zealand. In 2020, he moved to Turkish second tier club İstanbulspor.

In 2021, Whyte joined Miramar Rangers (an amateur Wellington based club). After a disappointing stint with the Wellington Phoenix Reserves he was freely transferred to Finnish club Haka.

Honours
Miramar Rangers
 New Zealand National League: 2021

Individual
 New Zealand National League Golden Boot: 2021

References

Expatriate footballers in Finland
FC Haka players
New Zealand expatriate sportspeople in Turkey
Team Wellington players
New Zealand expatriate sportspeople in Finland
Miramar Rangers AFC players
Living people
New Zealand expatriate association footballers
New Zealand association footballers
2000 births
Association football midfielders
İstanbulspor footballers
Expatriate footballers in Turkey
Expatriate footballers in Portugal
Sportspeople from Wellington City